Schommer is a surname. Notable people with the surname include:

John Schommer (1884–1960), American multi-sport athlete
Nick Schommer (born 1986), American football player
Paul Schommer (born 1992), American biathlete
Robert Schommer (1946–2001), American observational astronomer

See also
12514 Schommer, a main-belt asteroid

Jewish surnames